Sylwia Jaśkowiec (born 1 March 1986) is a Polish cross-country skier who has competed since 2002.

Career
At the 2010 Winter Olympics in Vancouver, she finished 24th in the 30 km, 28th in the 10 km, and 34th in the 7.5 km + 7.5 km double pursuit event.

At the FIS Nordic World Ski Championships 2009 in Liberec, Jaśkowiec finished sixth in the 4 × 5 km relay, 31st in the individual sprint, 31st in the 7.5 km + 7.5 km double pursuit, and did not start in the 30 km event.

Her best World Cup finish was ninth in the 4 × 5 km relay in France in 2008 while her best individual finish was 23rd twice.

On 22 February 2015 in Falun, Sweden, Jaśkowiec and teammate Justyna Kowalczyk won the bronze medal for Poland at the World Championships in team sprint.

Cross-country skiing results
All results are sourced from the International Ski Federation (FIS).

Olympic Games

World Championships
 1 medal – (1 bronze)

World Cup

Season standings

Individual podiums
 1 podium – (1 )

Team podiums
 1 podium – (1 )

References

External links

 

1986 births
Cross-country skiers at the 2010 Winter Olympics
Cross-country skiers at the 2014 Winter Olympics
Cross-country skiers at the 2018 Winter Olympics
Living people
Olympic cross-country skiers of Poland
Polish female cross-country skiers
Tour de Ski skiers
People from Myślenice
Sportspeople from Lesser Poland Voivodeship
FIS Nordic World Ski Championships medalists in cross-country skiing